Carlos Aldunate Solar (May 11, 1856 – June 14, 1931) was a politician in the Partido Conservador of Chile.

Biography 
He was born in Santiago on May 11, 1856 and died in Santiago on June 14, 1931. Aldunate was a descendant of José Miguel Carrera.

Studies and career 
 Aldunate studied at the Instituto Nacional, Facultad de Derecho, and the University of Chile.
 He was sworn in as an attorney for the Board of Charities on January 10, 1876, where he worked for 15 years.
 From October 16, 1922, to December 21, 1922 he was the Minister of Foreign Affairs, Cult, and Colonization.
 From September 12, 1924, to January 23, 1925, he was the Minister of Foreign of Affairs.
 Aldunate was the co-owner of Parcela en Lampa, Sector Lo Fontecilla, in Santiago.
 Senator from 1915 to 1921.
 Partido Conservador chairman for several terms.
 Deputy under President Arturo Alessandri.
 Vice President of the Senate in 1913.

Bibliography 
Carlos Gispert (2000) - Enciclopedia de Chile, Diccionario, Tomo 1. Editorial OCEANO.

1856 births
1931 deaths
Politicians from Santiago
Chilean people of Basque descent
Chilean Roman Catholics
Conservative Party (Chile) politicians
Foreign ministers of Chile
Members of the Senate of Chile
19th-century Chilean lawyers
University of Chile alumni